The 2013 KBS Drama Awards is a ceremony honoring the outstanding achievement in television on the Korean Broadcasting System (KBS) network for the year of 2013. It was held on December 31, 2013 and hosted by actors Lee Mi-sook, Shin Hyun-joon, Joo Sang-wook, and Im Yoona.

Nominations and winners
(Winners denoted in bold)

References

External links
 
 

KBS Drama Awards
KBS Drama Awards
KBS Drama Awards